Tegostoma lepidalis is a moth in the family Crambidae. It was described by Gottlieb August Wilhelm Herrich-Schäffer in 1851. It is found in Afghanistan.

References

Odontiini
Moths described in 1851
Moths of Asia
Taxa named by Gottlieb August Wilhelm Herrich-Schäffer